Bakur may refer to:

Places
Bakur, Iran, village in Kamaraj Rural District, Kamaraj and Konartakhteh District, Kazerun
Chumar Bakur, gemstone mining area

People with the given name
Bakur Gogitidze (born 1973), Georgian wrestler
Bakur Kvezereli (born 1981), Georgian-American entrepreneur
Pacorus of Armenia, 2nd-century king

People with the surname
Abdulgadir Ilyas Bakur (born 1990), Nigerian-born Qatari football player
Nerses Bakur, Caucasian Albanian Church in the late 7th and early 8th century